Some famous temples built by the Western Chalukyas, referred to as the "Later Chalukya art" that flourished in and around the Tungabhadra River districts of modern Karnataka state, India, are included in the table below.

Notes

References

 
  
 
 
 
 
 
 

Hindu temples in Karnataka